Electric company can mean:

Electrical power industry
Electric Company (band), an electronic music project of Brad Laner
Electric Company (football)
The Electric Company, a 1971 TV series
The Electric Company (2009 TV series), the 2009 reboot